The 2022 Arkansas gubernatorial election took place on November 8, 2022, to elect the governor of Arkansas. Incumbent Republican Governor Asa Hutchinson was term-limited and could not seek re-election to a third term.  Republican Sarah Huckabee Sanders, daughter of former Arkansas governor Mike Huckabee, defeated Democrat Chris Jones to become the first woman ever elected to the office, and was sworn in on January 10, 2023.

Primary elections in Arkansas were held on May 24. Runoff elections for instances where no candidate receives over 50% of the vote were scheduled for June 21. Former White House press secretary Sarah Huckabee Sanders won the Republican nomination, while Chris Jones won the Democratic nomination.

Leading up to the Republican Primary, Sanders received many endorsements from key Republican figures, including Donald Trump, Mike Pence, incumbent Asa Hutchinson, Arkansas' entire U.S. Congressional delegation, and dozens of GOP representatives from the State House and State Senate. She cruised to a landslide victory in the primary, and as Arkansas is a GOP stronghold, her victory virtually guaranteed she would win the general election, in which she defeated Jones by 28 points. Jones became the first Democrat to win Washington County since 2010, and Sanders became the first Republican to win majority-Black Crittenden County since her father in 1998. This is the first time ever that a Republican won three straight gubernatorial elections in the state's history. 

Sanders became the first female Governor of Arkansas, as well as the first daughter of a former governor to take office in United States history. In addition, with the election of Leslie Rutledge as lieutenant governor, Arkansas, along with Massachusetts, became the first two U.S. states to have both a female governor and female lieutenant Governor serving at the same time.

Republican primary

Candidates

Nominee 
 Sarah Huckabee Sanders, former White House press secretary (2017–2019) and daughter of former Governor Mike Huckabee

Eliminated in primary 
Francis "Doc" Washburn, radio personality

Withdrew
 Tim Griffin, lieutenant governor of Arkansas (2015–2023) (ran for attorney general) (endorsed Sanders)
 Leslie Rutledge, Arkansas attorney general (2015–2023) (ran for lieutenant governor) (endorsed Sanders)

Endorsements

Polling

Results

Democratic primary

Candidates

Nominee 
 Chris Jones, nuclear engineer, MIT graduate, and former executive director of the Arkansas Regional Innovation Hub

Eliminated in primary 
 Anthony Bland, public school teacher and nominee for lieutenant governor in 2018
 James "Rus" Russell, small business owner
 Supha Xayprasith-Mays, entrepreneur
 Jay Martin, lawyer and former Majority Leader of the Arkansas House of Representatives

Declined 
 Kelly Krout, candidate for state representative in 2020 (running for lieutenant governor)
 Greg Leding, state senator (2019–present), former state representative (2011–2019), and former minority leader of the Arkansas House of Representatives (2012–2014) (running for re-election to the State Senate)
 Clarke Tucker, state senator (2021–present), former state representative (2015–2019), and nominee for Arkansas's 2nd congressional district in 2018 (ran for re-election to the State Senate)

Endorsements

Polling

Results

Libertarian convention

Candidates

Nominee 
Ricky Harrington, Christian missionary, prison chaplain, and nominee for U.S. Senator in 2020

Independents

Candidates

Declared 
 William E. Gates, senior pastor at the church of Christian Jewish Freedom in Little Rock

Write-ins

Candidates

Declared 
Dan Nelson, activist
Michael Woodard
Elvis Presley, perennial candidate

General election

Predictions

Endorsements

Polling
Aggregate polls

Graphical summary

Sarah Huckabee Sanders vs. generic Democrat

Generic Republican vs. generic Democrat

Debates

Results

See also 
 2022 Arkansas elections

Notes

References

External links 
Official campaign websites
 William E. Gates (I) for Governor
 Ricky Harrington (L) for Governor
 Chris Jones (D) for Governor
 Sarah Huckabee Sanders (R) for Governor

2022
Arkansas
Governor